Semiplotus is a genus of cyprinid fishes found in south Asia.

Species
There are currently three recognized species in this genus:
 Semiplotus cirrhosus B. L. Chaudhuri, 1919
 Semiplotus manipurensis Vishwanath & Kosygin, 2000
 Semiplotus modestus F. Day, 1870 (Burmese kingfish)

References

Cyprinidae genera
Cyprinid fish of Asia